"Myself" is a song written, produced, and performed by Canadian rapper Nav, originally released to SoundCloud and YouTube on January 12, 2016. It was officially released as the lead track from his self-titled debut mixtape on February 24, 2017 before being released as the second and final single on April 11 that same year.

Charts

Certifications

Release history

References

 

 

2017 singles
Republic Records singles
Nav (rapper) songs
Songs written by Nav (rapper)
Song recordings produced by Nav (rapper)
2016 songs